Maryland Route 440 (MD 440) is a state highway in the U.S. state of Maryland.  Known as Dublin Road, the state highway runs  from MD 543 in Ady east to U.S. Route 1 (US 1) near Dublin.  MD 440 was built between Ady and MD 136 in Dublin in the early 1930s and extended east to US 1 in 1956.

Route description

MD 440 begins at an intersection with MD 543 (Ady Road) in the hamlet of Ady.  The state highway heads east as a two-lane undivided road through farmland.  MD 440 passes by the forested Scarboro Conservation Area and passes through the hamlet of Scarboro before intersecting MD 136 (Whiteford Road) in the village of Dublin.  The state highway crosses Peddler Run before reaching its eastern terminus at US 1 (Conowingo Road) between Dublin and Darlington.

History
MD 440 was constructed as a macadam road from MD 543 at Ady to MD 136 in Dublin between 1930 and 1933.  The state highway was extended east to US 1 in 1956.

Junction list

See also

References

External links

MDRoads: MD 440

440
Maryland Route 440